WhistleOut is a comparison website that assists consumers in shopping for cellphone plans. In Australia, the site also covers comparisons of fixed-line broadband plans, wireless broadband plans, and subscription TV service offerings. The technology that powers WhistleOut's search engine is used by several online publications such as The Sydney Morning Herald, News.com.au, and Yahoo, and technology sites such as Android Central and TechRadar.

WhistleOut has been featured on USA Today, ABC Good Morning America, Money.com, the Sydney Morning Herald, and News Ltd.

Company history
WhistleOut was launched in Sydney, Australia in May 2008 with an initial focus on just mobile phone plans. Later the search tool expanded to include comparisons of broadband plans, subscription TV offers, and financial services.

Eventually, credit card and home loan comparisons were removed, and the company returned its focus to comparison shopping of communication services. The Australia site currently compares over 16,000 plan combinations from 30 suppliers.

WhistleOut globally
The WhistleOut comparison engine is now available in 6 countries. 
WhistleOut Australia launched in May 2008.
WhistleOut UK launched in January 2012
WhistleOut New Zealand launched in October 2012
WhistleOut US launched in January 2013
WhistleOut Canada launched in June 2014
WhistleOut Mexico launched in February 2016.

References

External links
 WhistleOut
 WhistleOut Australia

Technology websites
Australian websites